Andreas Skov Olsen (born 29 December 1999) is a Danish professional footballer who plays as a winger or a right midfielder for Belgian Pro League side Club Brugge and the Denmark national team.

Youth career
Olsen started his career at local club, ASGI from Alsønderup, outside of Hillerød, but later joined the FC Nordsjælland at the age of 12.

Club career

Nordsjælland
Already at the age of 17, Olsen was called up by the coach of the Danish national under-21 football team, to replace an injured Kasper Junker in June 2017. He then got his debut for the U21 national team in a game against Sweden U21.

The winger got his first senior call up on 17 July 2017, where he sat on the bench for the whole game against OB. He was also with the first team squad in Sweden in the summer 2017, where he played a in a friendly match.

Olsen got his debut for FC Nordsjælland on 23 July 2017 at the age of 17. He started on the bench, but replaced Emiliano Marcondes in the 95th minute in a 3–2 victory against Brøndby IF in the Danish Superliga. Few days later, he played 72 minutes in a Danish Cup game against amateur side Vejgaard B, where he both scored and assisted a goal.

On 12 July 2018, Olsen scored his first European goal in a Europa League Qualifier against Cliftonville.

Olsen was officially promoted to the first team squad from the summer 2018. Olsen had a turbulent first half season in the Danish Superliga scoring 11 goals despite his young age. He ended the season scoring 22 league goals.

Bologna
On 24 July 2019, it was confirmed, that Olsen had left Denmark after two seasons in the Danish Superliga, to join Italian Serie A club Bologna.

Club Brugge
On 28 January 2022, Bologna announced Olsen's transfer to Club Brugge in Belgium, where he signed a four-and-a-half-year contract. He made his debut on 2 February in a Belgian Cup match against Gent, coming off the bench for Ruud Vormer at half-time and providing the decisive assist for Charles De Ketelaere, securing a 1–0 win for his team. On 17 July 2022, Olsen scored the winning goal for Club in the 2022 Belgian Super Cup against Gent.

International career
Olsen was called up to the senior Denmark squad for the UEFA Nations League matches against Belgium and England in September 2020. He made his debut on 7 October 2020 in a friendly against Faroe Islands and scored a goal in a 4–0 win.

In June 2021, he was included in the national team's bid for 2020 UEFA Euro, where the team reached the semi-finals.

Career statistics

Club

International

Scores and results list Denmark's goal tally first, score column indicates score after each Olsen goal.

Honours
Club Brugge
Belgian Pro League: 2021–22
Belgian Super Cup: 2022

References

External links
 
 Andreas Skov Olsen at DBU

1999 births
Living people
People from Hillerød Municipality
Association football forwards
Danish men's footballers
Denmark international footballers
Denmark under-21 international footballers
Denmark youth international footballers
FC Nordsjælland players
Bologna F.C. 1909 players
Club Brugge KV players
Danish Superliga players
Serie A players
Belgian Pro League players
UEFA Euro 2020 players
2022 FIFA World Cup players
Danish expatriate men's footballers
Danish expatriate sportspeople in Italy
Expatriate footballers in Italy
Danish expatriate sportspeople in Belgium
Expatriate footballers in Belgium
Sportspeople from the Capital Region of Denmark